Fabroniaceae is a family of mosses belonging to the order Hypnales. It has a worldwide distribution, in temperate and tropical regions.

The Fabroniaceae were established by Schimper (in 1855) to accommodate three genera: Fabronia , Anacamptodon  and Anisodon .(= Clasmatodon ). Only Fabronia is still considered a member of the family (Buck & Goffinet 2000; Goffinet & Buck 2004; Goffinet et al.2009). The Fabroniaceae are well represented in the tropics with few species occurring in the North Temperate Zone. They are polyphyletic.
Such as Merrilliobryum being found in Huon Peninsula, Papua New Guinea.

Description
They are tropical mosses that grow on tree trunks and have erect branches and exserted capsules with the operculum (a cap-like structure) beaked. The gametophyte, is pleurocarpous (side-fruited), forming patches, or growing through other Bryophytes. It has primary stems that are procumbent (and homomallous or uniformly bending). The leaves of main stems and branches are similar in form. The leaves are nerveless, or single-nerved. The leaf blade margins are flat; unistratose (single layer of cells) and finely crenulate or entire. The walls of basal leaf cells are thick and straight. They are dioecious.

Genera
As accepted by GBIF

Figures in brackets are how many species per genus

It includes 'Silky Urn Moss' or Fabronia pusilla.

Paulo E. A. S. Câmara and William R. Buck in 2012 carried out a phylogenetic study of Fabroniaceae, they state that the genus Levierella should be nested within the Entodontaceae family, with Dimerodontium among taxa traditionally associated with the Leskeaceae family.

References

Hypnales
Moss families